James V. Hart (born 1950) is an American screenwriter and author. He is known for his literary adaptations, such as Dracula, Frankenstein and Hook.

Career

Writing
Hart wrote the screenplay to the Steven Spielberg feature film Hook which functioned as a sequel to J. M. Barrie's original story, with Peter as an adult in present times. Later, he wrote the 2005 children's novel Capt. Hook: The Adventures of a Notorious Youth, a prequel depicting Barrie's villain Captain Hook, the nemesis of Peter Pan, when Hook was a youngster. He would then write the Francis Ford Coppola-produced horror films Bram Stoker's Dracula (1992) and Mary Shelley's Frankenstein (1994).

Hart would primarily focus on adventure and fantasy fare, such as Muppet Treasure Island (1996), Lara Croft: Tomb Raider – The Cradle of Life and Epic (2013). He would also co-create the pirate television drama Crossbones, with Luther writer Neil Cross. It was based on Colin Woodard's book The Republic of Pirates. On July 24, 2014, NBC announced that Crossbones had been canceled after one season.

Unmade screenplays
Hart did the first draft screenplay of Atlas Shrugged, which was to be fully developed by director Randall Wallace. Hart didn't write any further drafts and Wallace didn't end up directing. Recently, it has been announced that Hart wrote an adaptation of The Sirens of Titan, which Kurt Vonnegut approved of before he died.

Hart also wrote a screenplay adaptation for Crisis in the Hot Zone, but the movie never materialized (instead, Hart would adapt the book into a television series in 2019). Neither did a DreamWorks adaptation of Anubis. In 2012, it was announced that TNT would create a television series based on the Dean Koontz's Frankenstein novels. Hart was to write the project with his son Jake Hart.

Teaching
Hart was part of the Columbia University Graduate Film program faculty. He has also mentored on Sundance Film Labs, the Austin Writer’s Ranch and the Equinoxe-Europe Writing Workshops.

Personal life
Hart is the son of Albert Hart and Alice Hart. He has one brother, David (deceased). He studied film and graduated from Southern Methodist University in 1969. He lives in New York with his wife Judith. Their two children, Jake and Julia, are also screenwriters.

Filmography

Film

Television

References

External links

 
 Interview about Hook on www.hook-movie.com

1950 births
Living people
20th-century male writers
21st-century American male writers
21st-century American novelists
Hugo Award-winning writers
People from Fort Worth, Texas
American male screenwriters
Screenwriters from Texas
American male novelists
21st-century American screenwriters